Samal Ilyaskyzy Yeslyamova (Samal Iliiasqyzy Eslämova; born 1 September 1984) is a Kazakh film actress. She is recognized internationally for starring in the film Ayka directed by Sergey Dvortsevoy, which won her the award for Best Actress at the Cannes Film Festival in 2018.

Biography
Yeslyamova was born in Petropavl, North Kazakhstan Region, Kazakh SSR, Soviet Union. She always dreamed of becoming a journalist but eventually decided to become an actress. While studying at Russian Academy of Theatre Arts – GITIS in 2008, Yeslyamova played in the film Tulpan by Sergey Dvortsevoy. The film about the life of shepherds in the Kazakh Steppe won the main prize of the Prix Un Certain Regard competition of the Cannes Film Festival and another 9 Grand Prix of international film festivals around the world. In 2011, she graduated from the acting department of GITIS.

Ten years later, in May 2018, she received the Best Actress Award at the Cannes Film Festival for her role in Ayka by the same director. The actress played an immigrant worker from Kyrgyzstan who, driven by poverty, is forced to leave her child in the hospital. Filming lasted for six years.

In 2021, it was announced that Yeslyamova won the award for 2019 Best Actress for her role in the film “Ayka” at the Nika National Film Awards in Russia. Due to the COVID-19 pandemic, the 2019 and 2020 award ceremonies were postponed, and results were revealed in 2021.

Selected filmography
Tulpan (2008) as Samal
Ayka (2018) as Ayka
The Horse Thieves. Roads of Time (2019) as Aigal
Three (2020) as Dina Sadikhov

Awards and nominations

Notes

References

External links

1984 births
Living people
21st-century Kazakhstani actresses
Best Actress Asian Film Award winners
Best Actress Golden Orange Award winners
Cannes Film Festival Award for Best Actress winners
Kazakhstani film actresses
Recipients of the Nika Award
Russian Academy of Theatre Arts alumni